Julie Halard-Decugis and Sandrine Testud were the defending champions but did not compete that year.

Iva Majoli and Virginie Razzano won in the final 6–3, 7–5 against Kimberly Po and Nathalie Tauziat.

Seeds
Champion seeds are indicated in bold text while text in italics indicates the round in which those seeds were eliminated.

 Kimberly Po /  Nathalie Tauziat (final)
 Elena Likhovtseva /  Mary Pierce (quarterfinals)
 Els Callens /  Anne-Gaëlle Sidot (first round)
 Laurence Courtois /  Meghann Shaughnessy (first round)

Draw

References
 2001 Open Gaz de France Doubles Draw

Open GDF Suez
2001 WTA Tour